Rick Goings (born Everett Vernon Goings; October 13, 1945) is Chairman Emeritus of Tupperware Brands. He served as a petty officer in the United States Navy during the Vietnam era. Following this, he founded the fire detector distributor Dynamics, Inc. After his sale of the company, he worked in various positions with Avon, including president of Avon USA. In 1992 he joined Tupperware Worldwide as the CEO.

Early life
After high school, Goings served in the US Navy as a navigator on the USS Power, a World War II-era destroyer in the Red Sea during the Vietnam War. Goings was a platoon leader out of boot camp, and was honorably discharged from the Navy at the rank of petty officer.

He then attended Guilford College in Greensboro, North Carolina, where he majored in History. In his youth Goings also worked in several retail or direct-sales positions.

Dynamics, Inc.
While in his senior year of college, Goings founded one of the first direct sales of home fire alarm systems - the "Pyro Sentinel Heat Detection System" distributorship, in the United States. He hired fellow students to work in direct sales for the heat detectors, creating "fire safety crusaders" in their neighborhoods in order to raise awareness for fire safety.  At the time fire alarms were not common and smoke detectors hadn't been introduced yet in US homes.

Goings dropped out of college to pursue the company full-time, split up with his partner, and reformed the company in Charlottesville, Virginia as Dynamics, Inc.
Goings began to franchise Dynamics, and within a few years the company had 300 locations across the US. He led the company for fifteen years, until the Federal Government made smoke detectors mandatory and major retailers began carrying them in competition with Goings. He then sold his interest in the company.

Tupperware Brands Corporation
Following the sale of Dynamics, Goings began working with Avon Products, Inc. in 1985, where he held several positions including president of Avon Germany, group vice president and senior operating officer for the Pacific Rim, and president of Avon USA.

He joined Tupperware in 1992 as president of Tupperware Worldwide. One of his first actions was to turn the company's attentions to the overseas market, in order to compensate for the increasing difficulty of direct-sales models in the United States. The two markets Goings focused on most were Latin America and Asia, where "Tupperware home party social-networking" proved to be popular in a way that it once was in the United States during the 1960s. Within four years the company was earning 95% of its revenues from outside the US, with revenues of about $1 billion. This led the company to be spun off from its parent company in 1996, with Goings remaining in the position of CEO.

World Federation of Youth Clubs
Following more than a decade of collaboration with a handful of International youth organizations, in 2019, the World Federation of Youth Clubs was officially founded. Based in Orlando, Florida, it currently has member organizations operating in 39 countries outside of the United States. The 3,492 Club locations serve 379,000 youth and their families annually through facility-based organizations that provide educational programs, personal and leadership development, and family and community engagement.

WFYC's mission is to develop, advance and enhance global youth organizations that provide a positive environment and a safe place for young people around the world.

Boards
Goings is Chairman & Co-Founder of the World Federation of Youth Clubs. He is a member of the Tennenbaum Capital Partners Advisory Board. Rick is a member of National Board of Smithsonian Institution. He is chair of the Board of Trustees of Rollins College, a former member of the World Economic Forum (WEF), a member of the Board of Executive Advisors for the Yale School of Management's Chief Executive Leadership Institute. He is a former member of the board of directors for SunTrust Bank, N.A., the board of governors for Boys & Girls Clubs of America and of the boards of Reynolds American Inc. (formerly RJR), Premark International, Inc. and RR Donnelley. Goings was an inaugural corporate Impact 10x10x10 Champion for UN Women's HeForShe initiative  and a founding member of the organization's Private Sector Leadership Advisory Council.

Recognition
In 2010, Goings was recognized with the Knight of the Legion of Honour award by Nicolas Sarkozy for his dedication to the role of women and children in developing countries. The People's Republic of China awarded Goings the Marco Polo Award for his role in China's economic development and the Boys & Girls Clubs of America awarded him the Herbert Hoover Humanitarian Award, for his work as their national chairman. In 2013 Goings was named CEO of the Year by the Holmes Group.

Personal life
He resides in Windermere, Florida, with his wife, Susan Porcaro Goings (widow of the late Toto drummer Jeff Porcaro). He says he is traveling 70 percent of his time and practices Transcendental Meditation twice a day. In September 2014, Goings and his wife were awarded the second annual Voice for Women Award for their work to propel women's economic empowerment around the world at Sewall-Belmont House and Museum on Capitol Hill in Washington D.C.

See also
 Tupperware Brands
 Joseph (Joe) Hara

References

External links
 Bloomberg Businessweek Profile
 World Economic Forum Contributor Profile
 Huffington Post Contributor Profile
 Drucker Forum Blog

1945 births
Living people
American chief executives of manufacturing companies
American company founders
Guilford College alumni
People from Windermere, Florida
People from Wheaton, Illinois
United States Navy non-commissioned officers
Military personnel from Illinois